Grant van Heerden (born 17 October 1969) is a South African former cricketer. He played in one List A match for Border in 1992/93.

See also
 List of Border representative cricketers

References

External links
 

1969 births
Living people
South African cricketers
Border cricketers
People from Queenstown, South Africa
Cricketers from the Eastern Cape